Victoria station, also known as London Victoria, is a central London railway terminus and connected London Underground station in Victoria, in the City of Westminster, managed by Network Rail. Southern operates most commuter and regional services to south London, Sussex and parts of east Surrey, while Southeastern operates trains to south-east London and Kent, alongside limited services operated by Thameslink. Gatwick Express trains run direct to Gatwick. The area around the station is an important interchange for other forms of transport: a local bus station is in the forecourt and Victoria Coach Station is nearby.

Victoria was built to serve both the Brighton and Chatham Main Lines, and has always had a "split" feel of being two separate stations. The Brighton station opened in 1860 with the Chatham station following two years later. It replaced a temporary terminus at Pimlico, and construction involved building the Grosvenor Bridge over the River Thames. It became immediately popular as a London terminus, causing delays and requiring upgrades and rebuilding. It was well known for luxury Pullman train services and continental boat-train trips, and became a focal point for soldiers during World War I.

Like other London termini, steam trains were phased out of Victoria by the 1960s, to be replaced by suburban electric and diesel multiple-unit services; all services from the station are currently operated using electric multiple units. Despite the end of international services following the opening of the Channel Tunnel, Victoria still remains an important London terminal station. The connected Underground station, in particular, suffered from overcrowding, until a major upgrade was completed in the late 2010s. The Gatwick Express service provides easy access between Central London and Gatwick Airport for international travellers.

Location
The station complex is in Victoria in the City of Westminster, immediately south of the London Inner Ring Road. It is located south of Victoria Street, east of Buckingham Palace Road and west of Vauxhall Bridge Road. Several different railways lead into the station line by way of Grosvenor Bridge from the south west, south and south east. It is in Travelcard Zone 1 and is one of 19 stations managed by Network Rail. It has been a Grade II listed building since 1970.

Victoria Coach Station is about 300 metres south-west of the railway stations. It is the main London coach terminal and serves all parts of the UK and mainland Europe.

London Buses routes 2, 11, 13, 16, 24, 36, 38, 44, 52, 148, 170, 185, 211, 390, 507, C1, C10 and night routes N2, N11, N16, N38, N44 and N136 serve the station at Victoria bus station or neighbouring streets.

History

Background

By 1850, railways serving destinations to the south of London had three termini available – ,  and Waterloo. All three were inconvenient for Central London as they terminated south of the river Thames, whereas the main centres of population, business and government were north of the river in the City of London, the West End and Westminster.

Victoria Station was designed in a piecemeal fashion to help address this problem for the London Brighton and South Coast Railway (LB&SCR) and the London Chatham and Dover Railway (LC&DR). It consisted of two adjacent main line railway stations which, from the viewpoint of passengers, were unconnected.

Early history

The London and Brighton Railway terminus at London Bridge provided reasonable access to the City of London but was inconvenient for travellers to and from Westminster. As early as 1842 John Urpeth Rastrick had proposed that the railway should build a branch to serve the West End, but his proposal was unsuccessful.

However, the transfer of the Crystal Palace from Hyde Park to Sydenham Hill between 1851 and 1854 created a major tourist attraction in the then rural area south of London, and the LB&SCR opened a branch line from the Brighton Main Line at Sydenham to the site in 1854. While this was under construction the West End of London and Crystal Palace Railway also planned a line from Crystal Palace, to a new station at Battersea Wharf, at the southern end of the new Chelsea Bridge. Despite its location, the new station was called Pimlico. It opened on 27 March 1858, but was very much regarded as a temporary terminus, composed of a small number of wooden huts, and positioned immediately next to a proposed bridge over the Thames. Shortly afterwards the LB&SCR leased most of the lines of the new railway, and built a further connection from Crystal Palace to the Brighton Main Line at Norwood Junction, thereby providing itself with a route into west London, although it was recognised that a terminus would be needed on the north side of the river.

During the summer of 1857 a scheme for an independent "Grosvenor Basin Terminus" in the West End of London, "for the use of the Southern Railways of England" was mooted. The station was originally referred to as the "Grosvenor Terminus" but later renamed Victoria as it was sited at the end of Victoria Street. Three other railway companies were also seeking a terminus in Westminster: the Great Western (GWR), the London & North Western (LNWR), and the East Kent Railway (EKR). The first two already had rail access to Battersea through their joint ownership of the West London Line with the LB&SCR. In 1858, the EKR leased the remaining lines of the West End of London and Crystal Palace Railway from Shortlands railway station, and also negotiated temporary running powers over the lines recently acquired by the LB&SCR, pending the construction of its own line into west London. On 23 July 1859 these four companies together formed the Victoria Station and Pimlico Railway (VS&PR) company, with the object of extending the railway from Stewarts Lane Junction, Battersea across the river to a more convenient location nearer the West End, and the following month the EKR changed its name to the London Chatham and Dover Railway.

The new line followed part of the route of the Grosvenor Canal with Victoria station on the former canal basin. It required the construction of a new bridge over the Thames, originally known as Victoria Bridge and later as Grosvenor Bridge. It was designed by John Fowler. The line was built as mixed gauge from Longhedge Junction, Battersea, to cater for GWR trains. It required a 1-in-50 climb and a  turn from the LSWR main line to reach the bridge. The LB&SCR had hoped to amalgamate with the VS&PR, and introduced a parliamentary bill to allow it to do so in 1860. This was opposed by the GWR and LC&DR and rejected. By way of compromise the LB&SCR was permitted to lease Victoria station from the VS&PR, but agreed to accommodate the other railways until a terminus could be built for them on an adjoining site.

The LB&SCR side of Victoria station opened on 1 October 1860, the temporary terminus in Battersea having closed the day before. The station was designed by Robert Jacomb Hood. It consisted of six platforms and ten tracks, with an entrance on Victoria Street. The roof was built on a set of wrought iron girders, with an additional safety row that would allow the main girders to withstand a train strike. On the northwest corner of the station was the 300-bedroom Grosvenor Hotel. It was designed by J. T. Knowles, and run independently of the station itself. It opened in 1861. The LCDR and GWR opened their own station on 25 August 1862, occupying a less imposing wooden-fronted building with an entrance on Wilton Road. The Chatham line station had eight platforms, five of which were of mixed gauge, shared by broad-gauge trains of the GWR from Windsor via Southall.

Post-opening
Victoria station proved to be unexpectedly popular for both the main companies, and by 1862 there were frequent delays due to congestion at Stewarts Lane Junction. In March 1863 the LB&SCR and the LC&DR jointly funded a new high-level route into Victoria, avoiding Stewarts Lane and requiring the widening of Grosvenor Bridge, including the replacement of the broad-gauge rails with a third LB&SCR line. The work was completed during 1867/8. The South Eastern Railway (SER) wanted to use Victoria as a London terminus as it was more convenient than London Bridge, but were advised they would need to pay extensive tolls and expenses to do so. Consequently, the SER constructed a station at  instead.

The GWR began services on 1 April 1863, connecting Victoria to Southall, and later some services to Uxbridge,  and Windsor. From 13 August 1866 the LB&SCR ran services from Victoria to London Bridge along the newly completed South London Line. The Great Northern Railway began a service from Victoria to Barnet (via ) on 1 March 1868, with other cross-London services running via Victoria in the 1870s.

In 1898 the LB&SCR decided to demolish its station and replace it with an enlarged red-brick Renaissance-style building, designed by Charles Langbridge Morgan. Since widening of the station was prevented by the LC&DR station and Buckingham Palace Road, increased capacity was achieved by lengthening the platforms and building crossovers to allow two trains to use each platform simultaneously. Work was completed in 1908, and included the rebuilding of the Grosvenor Hotel at the same time. Overhead electric trains began to run into Victoria on 1 December 1909, to London Bridge. The line to Crystal Palace was electrified on 12 May 1911.

Victoria became well known for its Pullman services during the late 19th century. The LB&SCR introduced the first Pullman first-class service to Brighton on 1 November 1875, followed by the first all-Pullman train in the UK on 1 December 1881. Another all-Pullman service was introduced in 1908 under the name of the Southern Belle, then described as "... the most luxurious train in the world...". The SECR began Pullman continental services on 21 April 1910 and on domestic services to the Kent coast on 16 June 1919. The Golden Arrow, another all-Pullman train began services in 1924, and remained in service until 30 September 1972.

The LC&DR and GWR jointly leased the 'Chatham' portion of the station for 999 years from 28 June 1860, with the GWR responsible for 6.67%. The LC&DR completed its main line as far as Canterbury on 3 December 1860 and began to use the LB&SCR station on that day.

From 1899 the LC&DR entered a working union with its rival, the South Eastern Railway, to form the South Eastern and Chatham Railway (SECR). As a result, services from its station at Victoria began to be rationalised and integrated with those from the other SECR termini.

The LC&DR station began to be reconstructed in the late 19th century after several properties on Buckingham Palace Road, and the hotel, were bought by the company. Work began in 1899 with the removal of the old roof. The rebuilt station was partially opened on 10 June 1906, with additional platforms and cab exit on 10 February the following year, along with a new annexe to the hotel. It was formally re-opened on 1 July 1908. As a consequence of the rebuilding, boat trains become more popular from Victoria compared to Charing Cross and Cannon Street. Services increased to serve Ostend and Calais via Dover and Rotterdam via Gravesend. The LB&SCR part of the station also served Dieppe via Newhaven.

Victoria has since seen more visits from royalty and heads of state than any other London station. During the funeral of Edward VII, seven kings, over 20 princes and five archdukes were greeted here.

In the early 20th century, the development and improvement of the London Underground, meant that Victoria could not compete as a cross-London service. GNR trains stopped running on 1 October 1907, with Midland ones following on June the next year. The GWR ceased to use the station for scheduled services on 21 March 1915, partly due to World War I in addition to the new Underground lines. Victoria was used as the main station for drafted soldiers, and those returning from action in the war. By the middle of the war, the station served twelve trains a day running between Victoria and Folkestone, with additional trains serving Dover. The station was regularly served with a voluntary buffet for departing soldiers, who served up to 4,000 men a day. Victoria itself did not suffer significant damage during the war, but a section of Grosvenor Bridge was destroyed after an anti-aircraft shell struck a gas main underneath it.

Following the war, memorials were built on both parts of the station. The Southern Railway side marks 626 soldiers killed or missing, while the Chatham side marks 556. A plaque marks the arrival of the body of The Unknown Warrior at Victoria on 10 November 1920.

The service to Ostend via Dover was re-introduced on 18 January 1919. Civilian trains to Boulogne via Folkestone restarted on 3 February. Boat train services to Newhaven started on 1 June, and a connection with Paris started on 15 July. On 8 January 1920, Victoria replaced Charing Cross as the main station for continental services, as it had more facilities and closer locomotive and carriage facilities. The service to Paris via Calais and Dover began on the same day.

Southern Railway

The two stations at Victoria came largely under single ownership in 1923 with the formation of the Southern Railway (SR) as part of the Big Four grouping. The following year steps were taken to integrate the two stations. The platforms were renumbered in a single sequence, openings were made in the wall separating them to allow passengers to pass from one to the other without going into the street, and alterations were made to the tracks to allow for interchangeable working. The work was completed in 1925, and all platforms were renumbered in a contiguous sequence. The SR also concentrated continental steamer traffic at Victoria, introducing the Golden Arrow, in 1924, and the Night Ferry in 1936.

The station had a news cinema (later a cartoon cinema) that showed a continuous programme. The cinema was designed by Alister MacDonald, son of the Prime Minister Ramsay, and was in operation from 1933 until it was demolished in 1981. The GWR remained part-owner of the station until 1932 thereafter retaining running powers, although it does not appear to have used them.

Night-train services stopped running from Victoria on 4 September 1939 after World War II was declared, and other services were terminated following the German invasion of France in May 1940. Though the station was bombed several times in 1940 and 1941, there was not enough damage to prevent operations. A plane crashed into the eastern side of the station on 15 September 1940 and a flying bomb caused partial damage on 27 June 1944.

The greatest change to the station during the 1920s and 1930s was the introduction of third-rail electrification for all suburban and many main-line services, replacing the original LB&SCR overhead scheme by 1929 and largely replacing steam traction, except on Chatham Section main-line and Oxted line trains. By 1932 the Brighton Main Line was electrified, quickly followed by those to other Sussex coastal towns and Portsmouth by 1938. The brand name "Southern Electric" was applied to all these services. The Brighton Belle, the first electric all-Pullman service in the world, ran from Victoria from 29 June 1934 until its withdrawal in 1972.

Nationalisation

British Railways (BR) took over the station on 1 January 1948. A new set of offices for Continental trains opened on 14 June, while the eastern booking hall was renovated, opening on 5 February 1951.

During the 1950s and early 1960s British Railways (Southern Region) completed its Kent Coast Electrification schemes, which meant that most of the remaining services from the station were electrified, including boat trains. Some minor services were withdrawn, and the few remaining steam services, to Oxted and beyond, were replaced by diesel-electric multiple units. Various plans were proposed at this time to redevelop Victoria, including new offices, hotels and a helicopter station.

Platforms 16 and 17 opened on the site of the former taxi rank on 21 December 1987. A major re-signalling scheme was carried out during the works. The station was managed by Network SouthEast also under British Rail.

The other major change to the station under BR was the gradual development of services to Gatwick Airport station after its opening on 28 May 1958. A dedicated rail-air terminal opened on top of platform 15 on 1 May 1962, designed by Clive Pascall.

Several long-standing services from Victoria ended during the BR era. The Brighton Belles final service was on 30 April 1972, followed by the last Golden Arrow on 30 September. The Night Ferry lasted until 31 October 1980, though the Venice-Simplon Orient Express, a luxury Pullman service, has been running intermittently since 1982.

In 1984 the non-stop Gatwick Express service was started, aiming for a 30-minute journey time. This was coupled with the provision of an airport lounge and check-in facilities at first-floor level, with dedicated escalators down to the Gatwick Express platforms. British Airways and other major airlines had their own check-in desks there. British Rail operated an International Travel Centre within the main station, separate from the domestic travel centre. At the time, Victoria was still a major departure point for international travel, with boat trains to Dover and Folkestone for France and Belgium and beyond. This ceased with the introduction of Eurostar in 1994, which did not serve Victoria, and the International Travel Centre closed.

Services
In 2019/20, Victoria was the second-busiest station in the UK, with an estimated 73.6 million passenger entries/exits. However, as with other stations, patronage dropped dramatically as a result of the COVID-19 pandemic. The estimated usage figure fell 81% in 2020/21 to 13.8 million, although Victoria retained its rank in second place, behind .

Operationally, there are two separate main line termini:

 The eastern (Chatham) side, comprising platforms 1–8, is the terminus for Southeastern services to Kent on the Chatham Main Line and its branches. This is also the London terminus for the Venice-Simplon Orient Express, from Platform 2, the longest platform. It was used for boat trains to Dover and Folkestone until these were made redundant by the introduction of Eurostar trains to the continent in 1994.
 The western (Brighton) side, comprising platforms 9–19, is the terminus for Southern and Gatwick Express services to Surrey and Sussex, including Gatwick Airport and Brighton on the Brighton Main Line and the East Grinstead branch on the Oxted Line.

Services are operated by Southeastern and Southern, owned by the Department for Transport and Govia respectively. All services at Victoria use electric multiple unit trains.

To help passengers choose the correct service, the floor of the main concourse at Victoria was marked with different coloured lines. Passengers could then follow the line marked with the specific colour for that service to arrive at their intended departure point.

Southeastern
Southeastern services at Victoria use platforms 1–8. The station is served by a mixture of metro and long distance (mainline) services. Metro services are operated using Class 465 and 466 EMUs whilst mainline services are operated using Class 375 and 377 EMUs.

As of December 2022, the typical off-peak service run by Southeastern in trains per hour (tph) is:

 2 tph to  via Beckenham Junction 
 2 tph to  via 
 1 tph to  via Faversham
 1 tph to  via Faversham
 1 tph to Gillingham via Chatham
 1 tph to Ashford International via Maidstone East

Southern
Southern services at Victoria use platforms 9-12 and 15-19 as of August 2022. The station is served by a mixture of metro and long distance (mainline) services. Southern Metro and Mainline services are both operated by Class 377 EMUs and Gatwick Express is serviced by Class 387 EMUs.

From 4 September, the typical off-peak service run by Southern in trains per hour (tph) is:
 2 tph to London Bridge via 
 2 tph to  via Sutton and Norbury
 2 tph to West Croydon via Crystal Palace
 2 tph to  via Epsom and Sutton of which 1 continues to 
 2 tph to  via 
 2 tph to  via 
 2 tph to  via 
 2 tph to  via  of which 1 continues to 

During the Suspension of the Gatwick Express, Southern Services at Victoria began to use Platforms 13 and 14 as well as operating the Gatwick Express fleet of Class 387 units. However this has now ended as Gatwick Express Services were reinstated in March of 2022.

Gatwick Express
Gatwick Express, formerly a separate franchise but now operated by Southern, run services from platforms 13 and 14. Ticket barriers were installed on these platforms
in 2011.

As of September 2022, the typical off-peak service run by Gatwick Express in trains per hour (tph) is:

 2 tph to Brighton (Stopping only at Gatwick Airport and Haywards Heath)

However, within the peak hours, Gatwick Express services stop at intermediate stations between Haywards Heath and Brighton such as Preston Park, Hassocks and Burgess Hill.

Thameslink

Thameslink operate limited services from London Victoria to Sevenoaks in Kent, usually on Sundays or early mornings.

Accidents and incidents

On 26 February 1884, an explosion occurred in the cloak-room of the Brighton side injuring seven staff, as part of the Fenian dynamite campaign.

On 27 August 1910, an empty LB&SCR stock train derailed due to inadequate signalling arrangements, leading to four injuries. On 17 July 1946, a light engine collided with a passenger train; several people were injured.

On 26 July 1939, as part of the IRA's S-Plan, bombs exploded in the luggage office at King's Cross and then in the cloakroom at Victoria. Five were wounded at Victoria; at King's Cross, one man was killed and 17 people severely wounded.

On 15 December 1959, a passenger train collided with a rake of parcels vans. At least eleven people were injured.

On 8 September 1973, a Provisional Irish Republican Army bomb exploded at the ticket office, injuring four people.

On the afternoon of 23 March 1988, Deborah Linsley was found brutally stabbed to death on a train arriving at platform 2 at Victoria. She had got on the Orpington-Victoria service at Petts Wood. A French au pair heard screaming from the compartment next to her on the final leg of the journey between Brixton and Victoria. Several people, including the au pair, reported seeing a suspicious blonde or ginger-haired man walking from the train and washing cuts on his face in the toilet of the station, while there were also sightings of a man seen staring at women boarding the train at Orpington and changing compartments at Penge East, possibly into Linsley's compartment. Despite the killer's DNA being known since 2002, the murder remains unsolved as of August 2022. There remains a £10,000 reward on offer for information leading to the capture of the killer.

On 18 February 1991, an IRA bomb exploded in a litter bin, killing David Corner, and injuring 38. A general bomb warning for all main-line stations had been received by telephone at 0700, but the Metropolitan Police Anti-Terrorist Branch chose not to close the stations.

In 2009 a woman was found by a Police Community Support Officer (PCSO) acting suspiciously. When approached she produced a gun and pointed it at a passing young child. Unarmed PCSO George McNaught of the Metropolitan Police wrestled the gun out of the woman's hands before overpowering and detaining her. The woman was arrested and PCSO McNaught was awarded the commendation of the High Sheriff of Greater London for his brave actions. He is the first PCSO to receive the award.

In March 2010, a youth was stabbed to death in Victoria Underground station, in front of numerous witnesses. Eight people were convicted of the killing in 2013. Three defendants were found guilty of murder and five were convicted of manslaughter.

The former British ambassador to the US, Sir Christopher Meyer, claimed to have been attacked on a Tube platform at the station in July 2018. Two teenagers were arrested and then bailed by police. However a witness subsequently claimed that Sir Christopher was injured after accidentally falling over.

On 8 May 2019, Class 377 electric multiple unit 377 142 collided with the buffer stop.

On 22 March 2020, during the global COVID-19 pandemic, a ticket office worker, Belly Mujinga along with another female staff member, were repeatedly coughed and spat on by a man from the public, who claimed to have COVID-19. A few days later, both Mujinga and the fellow worker fell ill with the virus. Mujinga had underlying respiratory issues and was eventually admitted to Barnet General Hospital and put on a ventilator. She died on 5 April, aged 47, leaving her 11-year-old daughter and husband. The police interviewed a 57-year-old man, who tested negative for the virus. No further action was taken as it was discovered that the incident was not a cause of Mujinga's death, as well as senior detectives concluding that "there is no evidence to substantiate any criminal offences having taken place".

London Underground station

There are two connected Underground stations at Victoria, on different levels and built more than a century apart. The older one, on the north side of the bus station, serves the District and Circle lines, constructed by 'cut and cover' methods just below road level. The newer station, closer to the main line station, serves the Victoria line, a deep-level tube. Each has its own ticket hall, and the two are connected by a pedestrian passage beneath the bus station.

The station was not built for this number of passengers, which resulted in overcrowding requiring crowd control measures to be implemented at busy times. A £700 million upgrade of the station was completed in 2018, which doubled the size of the existing station, as well as providing step-free access.

Circle and District lines
The DR connected to the Metropolitan Railway (MR, later the Metropolitan line) at South Kensington and, although the two companies were rivals, each company operated trains over the other's tracks in a joint service known as the "Inner Circle". The line was operated by steam locomotives, creating the necessity to leave periodic gaps open to the air.

From that date the "Outer Circle" service began running over the DR.

From 1 August 1872, the "Middle Circle" service also began operation through Victoria, from Moorgate along the MR on the north side of the Inner Circle to Paddington, then over the Hammersmith & City Railway (H&CR) to Latimer Road and then to Mansion House. On 30 June 1900, the Middle Circle service was withdrawn between Earl's Court and Mansion House. On 31 December 1908 the Outer Circle service was also withdrawn.

The original DR station was rebuilt at the beginning of the 20th century, initially as a single-storey structure. An office building was built above it later. The line was electrified in 1905. In 1949, the Inner Circle route was given its own identity on the tube map as the Circle line.

Victoria line

Plans for the route that eventually became the Victoria line date from the 1940s. A proposal for a new underground railway line linking north-east London with the centre was included in the County of London Plan in 1943. Between 1946 and 1954, a series of routes were proposed by different transport authorities to connect various places in south and north or north-east London. Each of these connected the three main-line termini at King's Cross, Euston and Victoria. A route was approved in 1955 with future extensions to be decided later, though funding for the construction was not approved by the government until 1962.

As part of the construction of the Victoria line, a new ticket hall was constructed just outside the main railway building. From the ticket hall, a set of escalators led down to the new Victoria line. This opened on 23 July 1971.

Station upgrade and expansion
Following growth in passenger numbers in the 2000s, Victoria Underground station became one of the busiest on the Underground, with around 80 million passengers a year. At rush hour, more than 30,000 passengers entered the station between 8 and 9am, and entrances to the station were frequently closed due to dangerous levels of overcrowding at platform level.

TfL subsequently upgraded and expanded the station at a cost of £700m between 2011 and 2018 to alleviate overcrowding and to provide step-free access. The work included expansion of the existing south "Victoria line" ticket hall, an additional entrance and ticket hall under Bressenden Place, new and replaced escalators, renovation and expansion work throughout the existing station, and step-free access. Overall, the work expanded the station by 110%, with 9 new escalators and 10 new lifts.

Although contributors to the public inquiry into the upgrade criticised that access to platforms was long and/or indirect compared to the direct access using the existing escalators, the work was permitted in July 2009. Construction began in 2011, and tunnelling for the project was completed in 2015 after complex work; tunnelling took place 60 cm from the existing District and Circle line tunnels.

The first phase of the project opened in January 2017, with a new entrance leading to a North Ticket Hall underneath Bressenden Place, linked to the Victoria line by new escalators and lifts. The work was undertaken by a joint venture of BAM Nuttall and Taylor Woodrow Construction. In January 2018, the second phase of the project opened, with a new entrance at Wilton Road in front of the mainline station and the expanded Victoria line ticket hall. The main project was completed in October 2018, when step free access between all lines was completed. Work to reinstate the bus station and the historic Duke of York public house continued until 2019.

Future
Victoria is a proposed stop on Crossrail 2, the route of which has been safeguarded since 1991. The District and Circle line ticket hall would be expanded and include a direct connection to the new Crossrail station. Crossrail 2 trains would also be able to reverse at Victoria. The service proposes to run 30 additional trains per hour through the station, which is expected to reduce crowding in Victoria by 25%.

The Docklands Light Railway has also been proposed to be linked with Victoria. As of 2020, these extensions of the DLR are not being progressed.

In January 2020, Victoria BID - the local Business improvement district - proposed removing the bus station from the mainline station forecourt to create a new "Station Square". Bus stops would be relocated to nearby streets.

Cultural references
Victoria station is mentioned in Oscar Wilde's The Importance of Being Earnest as the location where Jack Worthing was found by Thomas Cardew.

The station is mentioned in the Sherlock Holmes short story "The Final Problem", when Dr Watson catches a Continental Express train from Victoria to avoid Moriarty and his henchmen.

The Harold Pinter short play Victoria Station has the station as the intended destination that the driver never reaches.

See also
Murder of Deborah Linsley – unsolved murder of a woman that occurred on a train arriving at Victoria in 1988

ReferencesNotesCitationsSources'

External links

 London Transport Museum Photographic Archive
 Main line station

 Underground station

 Station information on Victoria Station from Network Rail

Circle line (London Underground) stations
District line stations
Victoria line stations
London Underground Night Tube stations
Proposed Chelsea-Hackney Line stations
Railway termini in London
Railway stations in the City of Westminster
Tube stations in the City of Westminster
Network Rail managed stations
Grade II listed buildings in the City of Westminster
Grade II listed railway stations
Former London, Brighton and South Coast Railway stations
Former London, Chatham and Dover Railway stations
Railway stations in Great Britain opened in 1862
Former Metropolitan District Railway stations
Railway stations in Great Britain opened in 1868
Railway stations served by Govia Thameslink Railway
Railway stations served by Southeastern
Union stations in the United Kingdom
Belgravia
Transit centers in the United Kingdom
1862 establishments in England
Arthur William Blomfield railway stations
Railway stations located underground in the United Kingdom
Train driver depots in England
London station group